The  Cutato is a river of central Angola, tributary of the Cuanza River. It flows to the northeast of Benguela. The town of Cutato lies on the river.

References

Rivers of Angola